Andrei Aleksandrovich Ovchinnikov (born 17 November 1986) is a Russian former professional football player.

Club career
He made his Russian Football National League debut for FC Metallurg Lipetsk on 3 November 2005 in a game against FC Avangard Kursk. Ovchinnikov is an important player for Metallurg.

References

External links
 

1986 births
People from Dobrinsky District
Sportspeople from Lipetsk Oblast
Living people
Russian footballers
FC Spartak Tambov players
FC Metallurg Lipetsk players
Association football midfielders